Laskowice  (also known as Laskowice Pomorskie) is a village in the administrative district of Gmina Jeżewo, within Świecie County, Kuyavian-Pomeranian Voivodeship, in north-central Poland.
 north of Toruń.

The village has a population of 2,500. It is a major rail junction, where the Bydgoszcz-Gdynia line merges with the connection to Warsaw, via Grudziądz.

References

Laskowice